Chayenne Ewijk (born 17 August 1988) is a Dutch former professional tennis player.

Ewijk has won seven singles and 19 doubles titles on the ITF Women's Circuit. On 23 February 2009, she reached her best singles ranking of world No. 229. On 20 October 2008, she peaked at No. 216 in the WTA doubles rankings.

Partnering Anastasiya Yakimova, Ewijk won her first $50k tournament in October 2008 at the ITF Jounieh Open, defeating Carmen Klaschka and Laura Siegemund in the final.

Playing for Netherlands Fed Cup team, Ewijk has a record of 2–2 in Fed Cup competition.

ITF Circuit finals

Singles (7–7)

Doubles (19–7)

Fed Cup participation

Singles

References

External links
 
 
 

1988 births
Living people
Dutch female tennis players
Sportspeople from Barendrecht